Créhange (Lorraine Franconian and German Krischingen) is a commune in the Moselle department in Grand Est in north-eastern France. The writer Joël Egloff (born 1970) was born in Créhange. It had a population of 3,868 in 2017.

Until 1793, Créhange was the capital of the County of Kriechingen, a state of the Holy Roman Empire.

See also
 Communes of the Moselle department

References

External links
 

Communes of Moselle (department)